Belgium has submitted films for the Academy Award for Best International Feature Film since 1967. The award is handed out annually by the United States Academy of Motion Picture Arts and Sciences to a feature-length motion picture produced outside the United States that contains primarily non-English dialogue. The "Best Foreign Language Film" category was not created until the 1956 Academy Awards, in which a competitive Academy Award of Merit, known as the Best Foreign Language Film Award, was created for non-English speaking films, and has been given annually since. Between 1947 and 1955, the Academy presented a non-competitive Honorary Award for the best foreign language films released in the United States.

, eight Belgian films have been nominated for the Academy Award for Best Foreign Language Film. Of these films, two have been directed by Gérard Corbiau: The Music Teacher and Farinelli. The six other Belgian directors to have films accepted as nominees are Jacques Boigelot, Stijn Coninx, Dominique Deruddere, Michaël R. Roskam, Felix Van Groeningen and Lukas Dhont. Boigelot's Peace in the Fields was accepted as a nominee at the 43rd Academy Awards, Stijn Coninx's Daens was a nominee in 1993, Deruddere's Everybody's Famous! was a nominee at the 73rd Academy Awards, Roskam's Bullhead for the 84th, Van Groeningen's The Broken Circle Breakdown for the 86th, and Dhont's Close for the 95th.

Submissions
The Academy of Motion Picture Arts and Sciences has invited the film industries of various countries to submit their best film for the Academy Award for Best Foreign Language Film since 1956. The Foreign Language Film Award Committee oversees the process and reviews all the submitted films. Following this, they vote via secret ballot to determine the five nominees for the award. Below is a list of the films that have been submitted by Belgium for review by the Academy for the award by year and the respective Academy Awards ceremony.

See also
List of Academy Award-winning foreign language films
List of Academy Award winners and nominees for Best Foreign Language Film
List of countries by number of Academy Awards for Best Foreign Language Film
Cinema of Belgium

Notes

References

External links
The Official Academy Awards Database
The Motion Picture Credits Database
IMDb Academy Awards Page

Belgium
Academy Award